Venda Nova do Imigrante is a municipality, with a capital of the same name, in east central Espírito Santo, Brazil. Created in 1989, by separating from Conceição do Castelo, it stands at a height of 630 meters above sea level. Its population was 25,745 (2020) and its area is 185.9 km2.

It was mainly colonised by northern Italian immigrants and still holds Italian-themed festivals such as the Polenta festival and wine festivals. Other such traditions still held on to are traditional Italian dancing and choral singing, often seen during such festivals.

Bordering municipalities include: (E) Domingos Martins, (N) Afonso Claudio, (W) Conceição do Castelo and Castelo in the south.

References

Municipalities in Espírito Santo